Acanthoplesiops is a genus of reef-dwelling fishes belonging to the family Plesiopidae. All species are very small, with the largest specimen recorded only reaching 27 mm standard length. They have several features which distinguish them from other plesiopids, the most obvious of which is the presence of one or two spines on the operculum.

Species
There are currently 6 recognized species in this genus:
 Acanthoplesiops cappuccino A. C. Gill, Bogorodsky & A. O. Mal, 2013 (Red Sea spiny basslet) 
 Acanthoplesiops echinatus Smith-Vaniz & G. D. Johnson, 1990 (Hiatt's longfin)
 Acanthoplesiops hiatti L. P. Schultz, 1953 (Hiatt's basslet)
 Acanthoplesiops indicus F. Day, 1888 (Scottie)
 Acanthoplesiops jessicae G. R. Allen, Erdmann & William M. Brooks, 2020
 Acanthoplesiops naka Mooi & A. C. Gill, 2004 (Tongan spiny basslet)
 Acanthoplesiops psilogaster Hardy, 1985 (Barebelly longfin)

References

Acanthoclininae